Ben Bezoff (April 18, 1914 – December 30, 1979) was an American politician who served in the Colorado House of Representatives from the Denver district from 1947 to 1951 and in the Colorado Senate from the 1st district from 1951 to 1955. He served as Speaker of the Colorado House of Representatives from 1950 to 1951.

He died of pancreatic cancer on December 30, 1979, in Denver, Colorado at age 65.

References

1914 births
1979 deaths
Speakers of the Colorado House of Representatives
Democratic Party members of the Colorado House of Representatives
Democratic Party Colorado state senators
20th-century American politicians